Nusrat Sultana is a Pakistani politician who had been a Member of the Provincial Assembly of Sindh, from June 2013 to May 2018.

Early life and education
She was born on 13 June 1952 in Mirpur Khas.

She has earned the degree of Master of Arts in Sindhi from the University of Sindh.

Political career

She was elected to the Provincial Assembly of Sindh as a candidate of Pakistan Peoples Party on a reserved seat for women in 2013 Pakistani general election.

References

Living people
Sindh MPAs 2013–2018
1952 births
Pakistan People's Party politicians
21st-century Pakistani women politicians